Henry Thompson may refer to:

 Sir Henry Thompson, 1st Baronet (1820–1904), British surgeon
 Henry Thompson (1625–1683) (1620s–1683), English merchant and politician
 Henry Thompson (1659–1700), English landowner and politician
 Henry Thompson (priest) (1797–1878), English cleric and author
 Henry Francis Herbert Thompson (1859–1944), British Egyptologist
 Sir Henry Thompson, 3rd Baronet (1796–1868)
 H. S. Thompson (1824–?), American songwriter
 Henry Gregory Thompson (1871–1942), Roman Catholic Bishop of Gibraltar
 Henry A. Thompson (1841–1889), United States Marine and Medal of Honor recipient
 Henry W. Thompson (1839–1906), South Australian sailor and politician
 Henry Thompson (veterinary surgeon) (1836–1920), veterinary surgeon and author
 Henry Thompson (Medal of Honor), United States Navy sailor and Medal of Honor recipient
 Henry Thompson (Australian politician) (1906–1964)
 Henry Adams Thompson (1837–1920), American prohibitionist
 Henry M. Thompson (1861–?), American businessman and politician
 Henry Yates Thompson (1838–1928), British newspaper proprietor and collector of illuminated manuscripts
 Henry Thompson (cricketer) (born 1992), English cricketer 
 Henry Thompson (footballer) (1886–?), English footballer

See also
 Harry Thompson (disambiguation)
 Hank Thompson (disambiguation)
 Henry Thomson (disambiguation)